Kim Yeong-nam (born 24 March 1991) is a South Korean footballer who plays as midfielder for Ansan Greeners FC in K League 2.

Career
Kim Yeong-nam joined Seongnam Ilhwa in January 2012.

References

External links 

1991 births
Living people
Association football midfielders
South Korean footballers
Seongnam FC players
Bucheon FC 1995 players
Asan Mugunghwa FC players
K League 1 players
K League 2 players
Chung-Ang University alumni